Sarojini Sahoo Stories is an anthology of stories by Indian feminist writer Sarojini Sahoo, written originally in Odia. The anthology was published in 2006 by the publisher Grassroots Kolkata, Bhubaneswar, India.

Literary theory
Though in her stories  Sarojini  deals with the social issues but she is basically a writer of individual values. In Odia literature, a reader can see there is always a conflict between social values and individual values. This conflict can be seen from the first short story "Rebati" written  by Fakir Mohan Senapati to now. In the nineteenth century, the social values are the dominion factor in Odia literature  but in post independent age, more individual value-based fictions came to the light. In this context, Sarojini says: "As a feminist I think I am more a writer and as a writer I think I am more a feminist."

Sarojini is considered as Simone de Beauvoir of India, but Sarojini is not like the feminists of the second wave. She has a distinct view on "Other" theory and according to her for their "Eternal Feminine" women are forced to relinquish their claims to transcendence and authentic subjectivity by a progressively more stringent acceptance of the "passive" and "alienated" role. It is not always due to man's "active" and "subjective" demands. They are the woman, unknowingly accept the subjugation as a part of 'subjectivity' Sarojini accepts feminism as a total entity of femalehood which is completely separate from the man's world. She writes with a greater consciousness of women's bodies, which would create a more honest and appropriate style of openness, fragmentation and non-linearity. Her fiction always projects a feminine sensibility from puberty to menopause. The feminine feelings like restrictions in adolescence, pregnancy, the fear factors like being raped or being condemned by society and the concept of a bad girl, etc, always have thematic exposure in her novels and short stories. Some of Sarojini's famous stories like "Smoke", and "Few Pages of Vacant Lot" are not found in this collection, though their English versions are available and readers can also read them from different websites.

The book starts with Sarojini's famous story "Rape" and ends with "Behind the Scene". Both the stories were responsible to raise a storm of controversy when these were published  originally first time in Odia. In "Rape", the writer asks a question whether a woman has no right for her sexual desire even if in her dream? And in "Behind the Scene" she compares the lesbian love with heterosexual love.

See also
Sarojini Sahoo
List of feminists
List of feminist literature
The Dark Abode

References

External links
  Sarojini Sahoo – official web site
  Sarojini Sahoo – Blog
  Sarojini Sahoo – Sawnet Bio
  Oriya Nari
  Orissa Diary
 Interview with Sarojini at 'The New York Times'  owned Portal
 Interview with Sarojini at French Portal

Odia literature
2006 short stories